Steven P. Thayn (born January 30, 1954 in Richland, Washington) is an American Republican politician who is the Idaho State Senator representing District 8. Previously, he served in the Idaho State House of Representatives, from 2007 to 2012.

Education
Thayn graduated from Emmett High School, attended Treasure Valley Community College, and earned his teacher's certification and bachelor's degree in political science from Boise State University.

Elections

References

External links
Steven P. Thayn at the Idaho Legislature

1954 births
21st-century American politicians
Boise State University alumni
Living people
Republican Party members of the Idaho House of Representatives
People from Emmett, Idaho
People from Richland, Washington